Jesús Castillo may refer to:

 Chucho Castillo (1944–2013), Mexican world champion boxer
 Jesús Castillo (composer) (1877–1946), Guatemalan composer
 Jesús Castillo (Mexican footballer) (born 1988), Mexican footballer
 Jesús Castillo (Peruvian footballer) (born 2001), Peruvian footballer
 Jesús Castillo Jr. (born 1960), Puerto Rican wrestler
 Jesús Castillo (baseball, born 1995), Venezuelan baseball player